This is a list of Indian snack foods. Snack foods are a significant aspect of Indian cuisine, and are sometimes referred to as chaat.

A

B

C

D

F

G

H

I

J

K

L

M

N

P

R

S

T

U

V

Unsorted
 Ganthiya
 Saggubiyyam punugulu
 Sooji toast

See also 

 List of brand name snack foods
 List of snack foods
 List of snack foods by country
 Snack
 Snacking
 South Indian snacks

References

Desi cuisine
Snacks
Indian fast food